The arrondissement of Nevers is an arrondissement of France in the Nièvre department in the Bourgogne-Franche-Comté region. It has 82 communes.

Composition

The communes of the arrondissement of Nevers, and their INSEE codes, are:

 Anlezy (58006)
 Avril-sur-Loire (58020)
 Azy-le-Vif (58021)
 Bazolles (58024)
 Béard (58025)
 Beaumont-Sardolles (58028)
 Billy-Chevannes (58031)
 Bona (58035)
 Challuy (58051)
 Champvert (58055)
 Chantenay-Saint-Imbert (58057)
 Chevenon (58072)
 Cizely (58078)
 Cossaye (58087)
 Coulanges-lès-Nevers (58088)
 Crux-la-Ville (58092)
 Decize (58095)
 Devay (58096)
 Diennes-Aubigny (58097)
 Dornes (58104)
 Druy-Parigny (58105)
 La Fermeté (58112)
 Fertrève (58113)
 Fleury-sur-Loire (58115)
 Fourchambault (58117)
 Frasnay-Reugny (58119)
 Garchizy (58121)
 Germigny-sur-Loire (58124)
 Gimouille (58126)
 Guérigny (58131)
 Imphy (58134)
 Jailly (58136)
 Lamenay-sur-Loire (58137)
 Langeron (58138)
 Limon (58143)
 Livry (58144)
 Lucenay-lès-Aix (58146)
 Luthenay-Uxeloup (58148)
 La Machine (58151)
 Magny-Cours (58152)
 Mars-sur-Allier (58158)
 Marzy (58160)
 Montigny-aux-Amognes (58176)
 Neuville-lès-Decize (58192)
 Nevers (58194)
 Nolay (58196)
 Parigny-les-Vaux (58207)
 Poiseux (58212)
 Pougues-les-Eaux (58214)
 Rouy (58223)
 Saincaize-Meauce (58225)
 Saint-Benin-d'Azy (58232)
 Saint-Benin-des-Bois (58233)
 Saint-Éloi (58238)
 Sainte-Marie (58253)
 Saint-Firmin (58239)
 Saint-Franchy (58240)
 Saint-Germain-Chassenay (58241)
 Saint-Jean-aux-Amognes (58247)
 Saint-Léger-des-Vignes (58250)
 Saint-Martin-d'Heuille (58254)
 Saint-Maurice (58257)
 Saint-Ouen-sur-Loire (58258)
 Saint-Parize-en-Viry (58259)
 Saint-Parize-le-Châtel (58260)
 Saint-Pierre-le-Moûtier (58264)
 Saint-Saulge (58267)
 Saint-Sulpice (58269)
 Sauvigny-les-Bois (58273)
 Saxi-Bourdon (58275)
 Sermoise-sur-Loire (58278)
 Sougy-sur-Loire (58280)
 Thianges (58291)
 Toury-Lurcy (58293)
 Toury-sur-Jour (58294)
 Tresnay (58296)
 Trois-Vèvres (58297)
 Urzy (58300)
 Varennes-Vauzelles (58303)
 Vaux d'Amognes (58204)
 Verneuil (58306)
 Ville-Langy (58311)

History

The arrondissement of Nevers was created in 1800. At the January 2017 reorganisation of the arrondissements of Nièvre, it gained one commune from the arrondissement of Château-Chinon (Ville), and it lost one commune to the arrondissement of Château-Chinon (Ville).

As a result of the reorganisation of the cantons of France which came into effect in 2015, the borders of the cantons are no longer related to the borders of the arrondissements. The cantons of the arrondissement of Nevers were, as of January 2015:

 Decize
 Dornes
 Guérigny
 Imphy
 La Machine
 Nevers-Centre
 Nevers-Est
 Nevers-Nord
 Nevers-Sud
 Pougues-les-Eaux
 Saint-Benin-d'Azy
 Saint-Pierre-le-Moûtier
 Saint-Saulge

References

Nevers